Yonamine (written: 與那嶺 or 与那嶺) is a Japanese surname. Notable people with the surname include:

Yonamine Chiru, Japanese martial artist 
, Japanese cyclist
, American athlete

Japanese-language surnames